Shea Butter Baby (Remix EP) is a remix extended play by American singer and songwriter Ari Lennox. It was released on March 27, 2020, by Dreamville and Interscope Records. The album was executive produced by Dreamville producer Elite. In addition, the majority of the album was produced by Dreamville's in-house producers: J. Cole, Elite, Omen, Ron Gilmore.

Background
The remix EP consists of three remixed version from Lennox's debut album Shea Butter Baby (2019) and features guest appearances from Doja Cat, Smino, and Durand Bernarr. It contained remixes for the songs "BMO", "I Been" and "Facetime".

Critical reception
An editor for HotNewHipHop gave a review of the EP writing "Throwing Doja Cat on one of the album's biggest hits was a smart move, and Doja's versatility allows her to make any song her own without overshadowing the original artist. Doja once again proves that she can drop bars, contrasting her signature raspy flow with her vocal prowess of a higher register. Smino comes in strong on the "I Been" remix, holding his own for the first half while offering a male voice to the relationship woes anthem."

Track listing 
Credits adapted from Tidal.

Notes

  signifies an additional producer.

References

Dreamville Records albums
Albums produced by J. Cole
2020 EPs
Remix EPs